Clinton Welander (born September 19, 1982) is a Grammy Award-winning audio recording and mixing engineer based in Los Angeles, CA.

Raised in Emmetsburg, Iowa, Welander moved to Los Angeles after graduating from the  University of Iowa  & Conservatory of Recording Arts and Sciences. He almost immediately began working at Sunset Sound Recorders and partner studio The Sound Factory, and has since been involved with many other independent projects. In 2012, Clinton received a Grammy Award for engineering Jimmy Cliff's Rebirth album.

References

Living people
1982 births
People from Emmetsburg, Iowa
American audio engineers